MultiBank Group is a global financial derivatives broker specializing in providing markets access to financial instruments, including forex, metals, indices, shares, commodities, and cryptocurrencies CFDs.

MultiBank Group is headquartered in Dubai, United Arab Emirates, and has over 25 global offices including Austria, Germany, UK, USA, Mexico, Cayman Islands, BVI, UAE, Ireland, Cyprus, Turkey, India, Seychelles, Malaysia, Tianjin (China), Hong Kong, Philippines, Singapore and Australia.

The Group offers traders over 20,000 financial products. With a paid-up capital of US$322+ million, a client base of over 1 million from 90 countries, and a daily trading volume of US$12.1+ billion in 2021, MultiBank Group is considered one of the largest financial derivatives provider worldwide.

In 2020 MultiBank Group achieved a notional turnover of over US$5+ trillion in financial derivatives with expectations of significant moves into the institutional markets via top-tier bank liquidity for banks, brokers, funds, and trading desks in the near future.

History
Founded in 2005 by Naser Taher in California, USA, MultiBank Group became one of the first financial brokers to start an electronic Forex and Financial Derivatives Exchange which allowed for transparency and marked the start of the company's ongoing expansion.

Mr. Taher has unparalleled experience in the financial industry, he has worked with many of the major global financial institutions such as BNP Paribas, Barclays, UBS, Merrill Lynch, Credit Suisse. As a prominent expert in the fields of E-commerce, Foreign Exchange, Electronic Banking Systems and raising Finance, he has held a number of prominent positions worldwide.

In 2021, Mr. Taher was awarded the prize of one of the Most 50 Influential Figures in the Global Financial Markets according to the Research Team by Smart Vision. In 2019, he was awarded, by the most prestigious Le Fonti Awards, as the CEO of the Year for Financial Services sector (Asia & Europe). And in 2014, he was awarded Honorary Credential by the Chinese Financial Government. In 2012, Mr. Taher was appointed by the Chinese Government as an Honorary Chief Financial Advisor. In 2008, he was appointed as the Vice President of the Chinese Banking and Entrepreneur Association, and was named the Head of the Irish Stock Exchange Development Project in Asia (2006). In 2004, Mr. Taher was appointed as the Senior Counsellor to the Board of Tradition Group of Companies (then the third largest trading house in the World).

Services and operations
MultiBank Group offers their clients various trading tools and infrastructure, including MetaTrader 4 and 5. In common with many MT4 brokers, the company offers the MT4 percent allocation management module, as well as the multiple account management tool (MAM and PAMM) tool for money managers.

MultiBank Group offers a Standard account type, oriented towards smaller accounts, a Pro account for traders with some experience, and an ECN account with tighter spreads for the more advanced traders.

In August 2021, the company announced the launch of its MEX Digital, a spot digital asset trading platform. MEX Digital expands the MultiBank Group footprint into the realm of cryptocurrencies and blockchain. It is building a rapidly evolving blockchain ecosystem which not only looks to advance the global financial system but to push the possibilities further to address societal and business challenges.

Regulation and protection
MultiBank Group claims to be one of the most heavily regulated financial brokers. Although the group comprises several entities that are regulated by 11 regulators across five continents, these entities are not related to the activity as a broker.

References

Financial services companies established in 2005
Companies of Hong Kong
Financial services companies of Hong Kong
Financial services companies of Australia
Financial derivative trading companies